WRZI (107.3 FM) is a radio station  broadcasting a Classic rock format. Licensed to Hodgenville, Kentucky, United States.  The station is currently owned by Elizabethtown Cbc, Inc.

Previous logo
 (WRZI logo under previous 101.5 frequency)

References

External links

RZI
Classic rock radio stations in the United States
Hodgenville, Kentucky